How to Analyze People on Sight or How to Analyze People on Sight Through the Science of Human Analysis: The Five Human Types is a 1921 book by Elsie Lincoln Benedict and Ralph Paine Benedict.
Published and bound by the Roycrofters in East Aurora, New York, remains as a top download on Project Gutenberg.

Content
In the book, the authors divided all people into five categories based on fat, chest size and the inner lungs and heart, muscles, bones and thinking part of the brain and gave their own description of their mentality and work, and also gave their own research-based advice on social and business deal with them and about their profession and marriage.

References

External links

 How to Analyze People on Sight by Elsie Lincoln Benedict and Ralph Paine Benedict at Project Gutenberg
How to Analyze People on Sight by Elsie Lincoln Benedict and Ralph Paine Benedict at librivox
1921 non-fiction books